Araucaria rulei (Rule araucaria, graceful pine) is a species of conifer in the family Araucariaceae. It is endemic to New Caledonia, where it is an endangered species. Its populations are fragmented and are generally made up of scattered individuals. It is restricted to serpentine soils, often with high nickel levels, and its natural range is almost completely restricted to areas rich in nickel. Nickel mining in New Caledonia has consequently been a major cause of its decline.

Araucaria rulei grows to around 30 meters in height, with long slender branches arranged symmetrically around the trunk, which extend horizontally and then turn upwards and branch out at the end, giving the tree an appearance sometimes compared to a chandelier. Male and female cones are produced on the same tree but on different branches, with branches at the top of the tree tending to produce female cones, while branches lower down make male cones. The cones stay on the tree for 2–3 years while the seeds ripen, which are around 3 cm long when mature. It is a slow-growing plant with slow regeneration capabilities, though in its natural environment it is tolerant of both very dry conditions and high winds which many other species of araucaria will not tolerate. The species was named for an Australian nurseryman John Rule, and is sometimes grown as an ornamental tree in Australia, with its large smooth leaves and the symmetrical dome shaped growth habit of mature trees considered attractive.

References

rulei
Endangered plants
Trees of New Caledonia
Endemic flora of New Caledonia
Taxonomy articles created by Polbot